Henry Benjamin Wheatley FSA (1838 – 30 April 1917) was a British author, editor, and indexer. His London Past and Present was described as his most important work and "the standard dictionary of London."

Life

He was a posthumous son of Benjamin Wheatley, an auctioneer, and his wife Madalina; the bibliographer Benjamin Robert Wheatley was his brother, and passed on expertise.

Wheatley was Assistant Secretary to Royal Society of Arts, 1879–1909; founding member (1903) and President of the Samuel Pepys Club, 1903–10; Vice-President of the Bibliographical Society, 1908–10, and its President 1911–13. In 1909 he was the President of the Sette of Odd Volumes, an English bibliophile dining-club.

He is buried in a family grave on the eastern side of Highgate Cemetery.

Works

Articles

Books
 Of Anagrams: A Monograph Treating of Their History from the Earliest Ages to the Present Time. Williams & Norgate, 1862.
 "Round about Piccadilly and Pall Mall, or, A ramble from Haymarket to Hyde Park], 1870
 What is an Index?, 1878
 Samuel Pepys and the World He Lived In'', 1880, 1st edition; [http://catalog.hathitrust.org/Record/007675799 online text, 5th edition, 1907 from hathitrust.org
 The Bibliographer, 1884.
 How to Form a Library, 1887
 The Dedication of Books to Patron and Friend, 1887
 How to Catalogue a Library. Published by Eliot Stock 1889.
 Remarkable bindings in the British Museum, 1889
 London Past and Present: Its History, Associations, and Traditions. John Murray, 1891.
Reliques of Old London, George Bell & Sons, 1896. (descriptions of buildings with lithographs by Thomas Robert Way)
 How to Make an Index, 1902.
 The Story of London, [Mediæval Towns Series] 1904
 Literary Blunders, 1905

As editor
 , 1865; 2nd edition, 1870
 Editor, Books in Chains by William Blades (includes Wheatley's introduction and brief bio of Blades, whom he knew), 1892

References

External links

 
 
 
 

1838 births
1917 deaths
Burials at Highgate Cemetery
Fellows of the Society of Antiquaries of London
19th-century British writers
20th-century British writers
Historians of London